Canada Sings was a Canadian reality music competition that premiered on August 3, 2011 on Global. Each episode features two  glee clubs representing various organizations and companies, who both prepare and perform a song and dance number for a panel of judgeswith the winner winning money towards a charity.

The second and final season premiered on May 15, 2012, at 10:00 p.m.

Series overview

Season 1 (2011)
Teams
 1-800-GOT-JUNK as "Junk Notes"
 Air Canada as "Airborne11"
 Eric Hamber Secondary School as "The Edutones"
 GoodLife Fitness as "The Power Chords"
 Hamilton Police as "Hammer Cruisers"
 Just Energy as "Just Energetics"
 Lone Wolf Real Estate Technologies as "Wolf Pack"
 Scarborough General Hospital as "Pulse"
 The Keg as "Team Keg Spirits"
 The Distillery Restaurants Corp. as "Run DRC"
 Toronto Fire Services as "The Sound of Fire"
 Toronto Zoo as "The Zooperstars"

Host
Matte Babel
Judges
Jann Arden
Pierre Bouvier
Vanilla Ice

Coaches

Episodes

Season 2 (2012) 
Teams
Dumas Mining as "Dumas Rocks" (Charity: CNIB Lake Joseph Centre)
Elmwood Spa as "InSPAration" (Charity: YWCA Elm Centre) 
GO Transit as "GO Glee" (Charity: The United Way)
Ontario Provincial Police as "Project Glee" (Charity: The Dave Mounsey Memorial Fund)
Ontario Science Centre as "The OSCillations" (Charity: Adopt-a-Class)
Peel Children's Aid Society as "Positively Peel" (Charity: Peel Children's Aid Foundation) 
Purdy's Chocolates as "Sweet Day" (Charity: MS Canada Society) 
Royal Bank of Canada (RBC) as "The Bank Notes" (Charity: Six Nations Community Food Bank)
Royal Canadian Air Force Band as "Super Sonic" (Charity: Soldier On)
Stampede Casino as "Deal With It" (Charity: Plan Canada)
Canadian Automobile Association (CAA) as "The Associates" (Charity: Sick Kids Foundation)
WestJet's "Cabin Pressure" (Charity: Alberta Children's Hospital)

Host
Matte Babel

Judges
Jann Arden
Laurieann Gibson
Vanilla Ice

Coaches
Scott Henderson (Vocal Coach)
Kelly Konno (Choreographer)
Sharron Matthews (Vocal Coach)
Christian Vincent (Choreographer)

Episodes

References

External links
 
Canada Sings at Global TV (season 1 episode 1, archived copy)

2010s Canadian music television series
Global Television Network original programming
2011 Canadian television series debuts
Music competitions in Canada
2010s Canadian reality television series